Arab and Jew may refer to:

 Semitic peoples, the descendants of Shem, who are the Arabs and the Jews
 Arab Jews, people who are both Arab and Jew
 Arab and Jew: Wounded Spirits in a Promised Land (book) an award-winning 1986 non-fiction book by David K. Shipler

See also
 Ashkenazi Jews, the traditional Jewish group of Western, Central and Eastern Europe
 Palestinian Jew
 Israeli Arab
 Arab (disambiguation)
 Jew (disambiguation)